William John Tebble (17 June 1928 – 9 August 2004) was an Australian rules footballer who played with Collingwood in the Victorian Football League (VFL). He went to Mortlake as coach in 1954.

Notes

External links 
		
Profile on Collingwood Forever

1928 births
2004 deaths
Australian rules footballers from Victoria (Australia)
Collingwood Football Club players
Mortlake Football Club players
Mortlake Football Club coaches